Iakob of Mtskheta was the second archbishop of the Georgian Orthodox Church in period of 363–375.

Bibliography
მოქცევაჲ ქართლისაჲ, შატბერდის კრებული X საუკუნისა, ბ. გიგინეიშვილისა და ელ. გიუნაშვილის გამოცემა, თბილისი, 1979
მოქცევაჲ ქართლისაჲ, ძველი ქართული აგიოგრაფიული ლიტერატურის ძეგლები, ილ. აბულაძის რედაქცია, წიგნი. 1, თბილისი, 1963
მოქცევაჲ ქართლისაჲ, ახლადაღმოჩენილი სინური რედაქციები, ზ. ალექსიძის გამოცემა, თბილისი, 2007
ცხოვრება ქართუელთა მეფეთა, ქართლის ცხოვრება, ს. ყაუხჩიშვილის რედაქციით, ტ. 1, თბილისი, 1955

Catholicoses and Patriarchs of Georgia (country)